Cornelius Hendrik "Case" Vanderwolf (1935 – June 16, 2015) was a Canadian neuroscientist.

Raised in the rural community of Glenevis, Alberta, Vanderwolf went on to earn a BSc from the University of Alberta and completed graduate work with Donald Hebb at McGill University, completing his PhD in 1962 (Buzsaki and Bland 2015). Following completion of his
PhD, Case spent a year at the California Institute of Technology with Roger Sperry (1962–1963) and another year with Konrad Akert, the Founder of the Brain Research Institute of the University of Zurich (1963–1964).

Vanderwolf spent over 30 years at the University of Western Ontario in London, Ontario, during which time he published over 140 papers on the relation of hippocampal, neocortical, and pyriform cortical activity to behavior and the dependence of many of these brain-behavior relations on the activity of central neurons that release the transmitter substances acetylcholine and serotonin.(Whishaw and Bland 1998; Buzsaki and Bland 2015). As early as 1964, he was among the first investigators to carefully study the correlation between observable motor activity and brain waves.
Recording from the thalamus and hippocampus of the behaving rat, he found a reliable relationship between 'voluntary movement' and rhythmic (theta) EEG activity. This early paper (Vanderwolf and Heron, 1964) was followed up by a detailed account of a variety of motor behaviors and hippocampal theta oscillation (Vanderwolf 1969). He showed that in the waking rat, hippocampal EEG is dominated by thetaoscillations (6 to 10 Hz; for this he coined a new term, rhythmic slow activity or RSA) during locomotion, rearing, exploratory head turning, and sniffing. In contrast, in other observable behaviors such as eating, drinking, grooming, and immobility, theta is replaced by "large amplitude irregular activity" (LIA).

He published two books, An Odyssey Through the Brain, Behavior and Mind and The Evolving Brain: The Mind and the Neural Control of Behavior, that provide an overview of his academic career and research findings. In 2000, he was awarded an honorary degree from the University of Lethbridge.

He died unexpectedly in his home on June 16, 2015, in London, Ontario, at the age of 79.

References

External links
https://web.archive.org/web/20110728034949/http://www.societyforqualityeducation.org/reports/SQE_Science_Report.pdf
https://web.archive.org/web/20110706201924/http://psyc.queensu.ca/~psyc371/pdf%20papers/vanderwolf98.pdf
http://communications.uwo.ca/com/western_news/stories/psychology_professor_to_receive_honorary_degree_20000317430553/

Canadian neuroscientists
Academic staff of the University of Western Ontario
University of Alberta alumni
McGill University alumni
People from Lac Ste. Anne County
Canadian people of Dutch descent
1935 births
2015 deaths